This is a list of television shows broadcast by Sky Witness in the United Kingdom and Ireland. The schedule for Sky Witness currently consists of a mixture of American drama and factual programming. The channel is pitched towards a female audience, but has in recent years changed that position to include males.

Current programming
9-1-1
9-1-1 Lone Star
Blindspot
Departure (moved from Universal TV)
Bull (moved from Fox UK)
Blue Bloods (moved from Sky Atlantic)
Chicago Fire (moved from 5USA)
Chicago Med (moved from Universal TV)
Chicago P.D. (moved from 5USA)
Coroner (moved from Universal TV)
FBI
FBI: Most Wanted
FBI: International
Law & Order
Law & Order: Organized Crime
Law & Order: Special Victims Unit (moved from Universal TV)
New Amsterdam (moved from Amazon Prime Video)
The Equalizer
The Good Doctor
The Rookie
The Rookie: Feds
Transplant

Upcoming programming
East New York

Former programming

 21 Jump Street 
 227
 6ixth Sense
 The A-Team 
 Abbey & Janice: Beauty & The Beast
 Ace Crawford, Private Eye 
 Adam-12 
 The Adventures of Ozzie and Harriet 
 The Adventures of Superman 
 Agony Hour
 Alice 
 The Amazing Race
 Amen 
 America's Next Top Model
 Archie Bunker's Place 
 Army Wives 
 The Bachelor USA
 Bad Girls Club
 Barbary Coast 
 Baretta 
 Barney Miller 
 Benson 
 Best of the West 
 The Betty White Show 
 The Beverly Hillbillies
 The Biggest Loser
 The Birth of the Spice Girls
 The Blacklist (moved to Sky One then Sky Max)
 Blood Ties
 Blow Out
 The Bob Newhart Show
 Body of Evidence
 Bonanza
 Bones (now on Disney+)
 Boston Legal (now on Disney+)
 Break with the Boss
 Brookside (now on BritBox)
 Britain's Next Top Model
 Burke's Law 
 The Burns and Allen Show  
 Campus Ladies
 Canada's Next Top Model
 Cannon 
 Car 54, Where Are You? 
 Carol Burnett and Friends 
 The Catch (now on Disney+)
 Catchword
 Celebrity Extra
 Charles in Charge
 Charmed (now on E4 Extra, All 4 and Paramount+)
 Chasing Farrah
 The Children's Channel
 CHiPs
 Crossing Over with John Edward
 Chuck
 Close to Home 
 Cold Case 
 The Comeback 
 Conviction
 Cougar Town (now on Disney+
 Crosswits
 CSI (now on Paramount+)
 The Cut 
 Da Vinci's Inquest
 Dallas 
 Daniel Boone 
 The Danny Thomas Show
 Dating in the Dark
 Dead Famous
 Dennis the Menace
 Derek Acorah's Ghost Towns
 Desi Rascals (moved to Sky One)
 The Detectives Starring Robert Taylor
 Dharma & Greg
 The Dick Van Dyke Show
 Diet on the Dancefloor
 A Different World
 Diff'rent Strokes
 Dirty Cows
 Dirty Dancing: The Time of Your Life
 Dog and Cat 
 The Donna Reed Show 
 Dracula 
 Dragnet 
 Dynasty 
 The Ed Sullivan Show 
 Eight Is Enough 
 Elementary (now on Paramount+)
 Emergency! 
 The Enfield Haunting
 Exposed
 Extreme Makeover
 Extreme Makeover: Home Edition
 F Troop 
 The Facts of Life 
 Falcon Crest 
 Fantasy Island 
 Father Knows Best 
 Fernwood 2nite 
 The Flip Wilson Show 
 The Flying Nun 
 Four Weddings
 Futurama
 Get Smart 
 Ghost Whisperer (now on Disney+)
 Gidget 
 Gilligan's Island 
 Gomer Pyle, U.S.M.C. 
 Good Morning with Anne and Nick 
 Growing Pains
 Hannibal
 The Hairdresser 
 The Hardy Boys/Nancy Drew Mysteries 
 Haunting Evidence
 Have Gun, Will Travel 
 Hazel 
 High School Reunion
 Hill Street Blues 
 Home and Away 
 The Honeymooners
 Hot in Cleveland
 Hunter
 Instinct
 I Pity the Fool
 I'm Famous and Frightened!
 Jade Changed My Life
 Jade's Salon
 Jade's P.A
 Jane Goldman Investigates
 The Janice Dickinson Modeling Agency
 Joan of Arcadia 
 Joanie Loves Chachi
 Julia 
 Just Jade
 Just Shoot Me!
 Justice
 Kath & Kim 
 Katie
 Kilroy
 Knight Rider 
 Knots Landing 
 Kojak 
 Lassie 
 Law & Order True Crime
 Leave It to Beaver
 Lincoln Rhyme: Hunt for the Bone Collector
 Lipstick Jungle
 Lois and Clark: The New Adventures of Superman
 Loose Lips 
 Lost in Space 
 Love American Style 
 The Love Boat 
 The Lucy Show
 The L Word
 Madam Secretary
 Mama's Family 
 Max & Ruby
 Mannix 
 The Many Loves of Dobie Gillis 
 Marcus Welby, M.D. 
 Mary Hartman, Mary Hartman 
 The Mary Tyler Moore Show 
 Maude 
 Mayberry RFD 
 McHale's Navy
 Medium
 Melrose Place
 Men in Trees
 Miss Match
 Mister Ed 
 The Monkees 
 Moonlight
 Mork & Mindy 
 Most Haunted
 Most Haunted Live!
 Mount Pleasant (2012–2014)
 Murphy Brown
 My First Time
 My Three Sons
 Nashville (moved from E4) (now on All 4)
 Nero Wolfe 
 Newhart 
 The Odd Couple 
 Outback Jack
 Outrageous Home Videos
 Paranormal Egypt
 The Partridge Family 
 Peak Practice 
 Perfect Strangers 
 Pete's PA
 Petticoat Junction 
 Phyllis 
 Police Woman 
 Private Practice (now on Disney+)
 The Psychic Detective
 Psychic Investigators
 Quantum Leap 
 Queer Eye for the Straight Guy
 RSPCA Animal Rescue
 The Rat Patrol
 Ready, Steady, Cook
 reLIVINGtv
 Rescue 911
 Retail Therapy
 Rhoda 
 Ricki Lake
 Ringer
 Room 222 
 Roseanne 
 Rowan & Martin's Laugh-In 
 Sanford and Son 
 Scandal (moved from More4) (now on Disney+))
 SceneOne  
 Scream Team
 Second City TV
 The Secret Circle
 Sensing Murder
 Shades of Blue
 Shane
 Showbiz Moms and Dads
 Solve Your Murder!
 The Sonny & Cher Comedy Hour
 Sports Kids' Moms and Dads
 St. Elsewhere
 Stalker
 Starsky & Hutch
 Supernatural (moved to E4)
 Tabitha
 Teen Wolf
 Tempestt 
 That Girl 
 That's What I'm Talking About
 The Three Stooges
 Tiny Living 
 To the Manor Bowen 
 Too Close for Comfort 
 Top Chef
 Tori & Dean: Inn Love
 Total Recall 2070 
 Trivial Pursuit 
 Trolley Dollies
 Trouble
 The Truth About the Harry Quebert Affair
 Turnabout
 Twin Peaks (now on Paramount+)
 The Underdog Show
 Unforgettable
 Veronica Mars (moved to E4) (now on Starzplay and ITV2 (seasons 1-3 only))
 Viva Laughlin
 WKRP in Cincinnati
 The Waltons
 Welcome Back Kotter 
 What's Happening!! 
 What's Happening Now!!
 Will & Grace
 When Chefs Attack
 The X Files (now on Disney+)

References 

Living programmes
Sky Living
Living TV Group